Nowferest castle is a historical castle located in Birjand County in South Khorasan Province; the longevity of this fortress dates back to the 3rd and 4th centuries AH until the Safavid dynasty.

References 

Castles in Iran